Where Are We Going, Dad? is a Chinese reality TV show broadcast on Hunan Television.  Based on the original South Korean reality show Dad! Where Are We Going?, the first season debuted on 11 October 2013 featuring five fathers and their children as they travel to rural places.  The series has become a massive ratings hit, attracting 75 million viewers per episode to Hunan Television every week. It was adapted into a film, Where Are We Going, Dad?, that was released on 31 January 2014. A second film, Where Are We Going, Dad? 2, was released on 19 February 2015. The second season debuted in June 2014 while the third season filmed on 17 May 2015 in Yulin.

Participants

Season 1

Season 2

Season 3

Season 4

Season 5

Episodes

Season 1

Season 2

Season 3

Season 4

Ratings

Season 1

|-
|1
|
|1.423
|6.74
|1
|1.1
|7.67
|1
|-
|2
|
|2.588
|11.53
|1
|1.67
|11.45
|1
|-
|3
|
|3.116
|14.43
|1
|1.8
|13.47
|1
|-
|4
|
|3.471
|15.26
|1
|2.16
|13.70
|1
|-
|5
|
|3.851 
|16.73 
|1
|2.13
|13.47
|1
|-
|6
|
|4.024
|18.16
|1
|2.30 
|15.92
|1
|-
|7
|
|4.748
|20.68
|1
|2.69 
|17.37 
|1
|-
|8
|
|4.76
|21.11
|1
|2.81
|18.51
|1
|-
|9
|
|4.98
|22.12
|1
|2.9
|18.68
|1
|-
|10
|
|5.3
|23.22
|1
|3.21 
|20.37 
|1
|-
|11
|
|5.008
|22.14
|1
|3.40
|21.41
|1
|-
|12
|
|4.916
|22.06
|1
|3.64
|22.45
|1

Season 2

|-
| 1 ||  || 3.927 || 16.82 || 1 || 2.43 || 14.24 || 1 
|-
| 2 ||  || 3.570 || 15.39 || 1 || 2.06 || 11.59 || 1 
|-
| 3 ||  || 3.605 || 15.81 || 1 || 2.34 || 14.06 || 1 
|-
| 4 ||  || 3.393 || 15.40 || 1 || 2.12 || 12.67 || 1 
|-
| 5 ||  || 3.08 || 13.73 || 2 || 1.91 || 11.24 || 2 
|-
| 6 ||  || 3.387 || 14.04 || 2 || 2.62 || 14.27 || 1 
|-
| 7 ||  || 3.485 || 14.78 || 2 || 2.44 || 13.76 || 1 
|-
| 8 ||  || 3.718 || 16.07 || 2 || 2.79 || 15.59 || 1 
|-
| 9 ||  || 3.640 || 15.45 || 2 || 2.53 || 14.85 || 1 
|-
| 10 ||  || 3.372 || 14.51 || 2 || 2.27 || 13.27 || 1 
|-
| 11 ||  || 3.296 || 13.45 || 2 || 2.46 || 13.21 || 1 
|-
| 12 ||  || 2.774 || 11.98 || 2 || 2.18 || 12.53 || 1 
|-
| 13 ||  || 3.067 || 12.96 || 2 || 1.99 || 11.28 || 1 
|-
| 14 ||  || 2.960 || 13.41 || 2 || 1.90 || 11.68 || 1 
|-
| 15 ||  || 2.844 || 12.47 || 2 || 1.84 || 10.58 || 1 
|-
| 16 ||  || 2.838 || 14.80 || 1 || 2.09 || 14.34 || 1

Season 3

|-
| 1 ||  || 2.856 || 14.16 || 1 || 2.28 || 13.82 || 1
|-
| 2 ||  || 2.418 || 10.68 || 3 || 1.82 || 9.88 || 2
|-
| 3 ||  || 2.461 || 11.41 || 3 || 1.94 || 10.96 || 2
|-
| 4 ||  || 2.331 || 11.40 || 3 || 1.81 || 11.32 || 2
|-
| 5 ||  || 2.496 || 11.45 || 2 || 1.97 || 11.21 || 2
|-
| 6 ||  || 2.625 || 11.74 || 2 || 1.98 || 11.51 || 1
|-
| 7 ||  || 2.454 || 10.92 || 2 || 1.90 || 10.86 || 2
|-
| 8 ||  || 2.422 || 10.86 || 2 || 1.73 || 10.59 || 2
|-
| 9 ||  || 2.441 || 10.83 || 2 || 1.76 || 10.68 || 2
|-
| 10 ||  || 2.132 || 10.34 || 2 || 1.43 || 9.72 || 1
|-
| 11 ||  || 2.077 || 9.31 || 2 || 1.27 || 7.64 || 2
|-
| 12 ||  || 2.217 || 10.999 || 1 || 1.66 || 10.69 || 1
|-
| 13 ||  || 1.643 || 9.128 || 1 || 0.97 || 7.55 || 2
|-
| 14 ||  || 2.136 || 10.529 || 1 || 1.41 || 9.43 || 2
|-
| 15 ||  || 2.175 || 11.02 || 1 || 1.32 || 9.19 || 2
|-
| 16 ||  || 1.572 || 8.004 || 3 || 1.12 || 7.84 || 3
|-

Marketing
Infiniti became a supplier for actors' official passenger vehicles, including Infiniti JX, Infiniti QX50, Infiniti QX70, Infiniti QX80.

Broadcast TV Stations
Start on July 24, 2015, Sky Link TV air Where Are We Going, Dad? simultaneously broadcast with Hunan Television on Fridays 21:00.

References

External links
Hunan TV Official website
Sohu TV site
Where Are We Going, Dad? at the official Hunan TV YouTube channel - Available in Chinese with English subtitles

Chinese reality television series
2013 Chinese television series debuts
Hunan Broadcasting System original programming
Parenting television series
Chinese television series based on South Korean television series
Infiniti